El Cementerio de Cristóbal Colón, also called La Necrópolis de Cristóbal Colón, was founded in 1876 in the Vedado neighbourhood of Havana, Cuba to replace the Espada Cemetery in the Barrio de San Lázaro.  Named for Christopher Columbus, the cemetery is noted for its many elaborately sculpted memorials. It is estimated the cemetery has more than 500 major mausoleums. Before the Espada Cemetery and the Colon Cemetery were built, interments took place in crypts at the various churches throughout Havana, for example, at the Havana Cathedral or Church Crypts in Havana Vieja.

Overview
The Colon Cemetery is one of the most important cemeteries in the world and is generally held to be one of the most important in Latin America in historical and architectural terms, second only to La Recoleta in Buenos Aires. Prior to the opening of the Colon Cemetery, Havana's dead were laid to rest in the crypts of local churches and then, beginning in 1806, at Havana's newly opened Espada Cemetery located in the Barrio de San Lazaro and near the cove of Juan Guillen close to the San Lázaro Leper Hospital and the Casa de Beneficencia. When locals realized there would be a need for a larger space for their community for the deceased (due to a cholera outbreak in 1868), planning began for the Colon Cemetery.

The Colón is a Catholic cemetery and has elaborate monuments, tombs and statues by 19th and 20th century artists. Plots were assigned according to social class, and soon became a means for patrician families to display their wealth and power with ever more elaborate tombs and mausoleums. The north main entrance is marked by a gateway decorated with biblical reliefs and topped by a marble sculpture by José Vilalta Saavedra: Faith, Hope and Charity. Some of the most important and elaborate tombs lie between the main gate and the Capilla Central. The Monumento a los Bomberos (Firemen's Monument) built by Spanish sculptor Agustín Querol and architect Julio M Zapata, commemorates the twenty eight firemen who died when a hardware shop in La Habana Vieja caught fire in 1890

In front of the main entrance, at the axes of the principal avenues Avenida Cristobal Colón, Obispo Espada, and Obispo Fray Jacinto, stands the Central Chapel modelled on Il Duomo in Florence is the octagonal Capilla Central (central chapel), the Capilla del Amor (Chapel of Love), built by Juan Pedro Baró for his wife Catalina Laza. On every side rectangular streets lead geometrically to the cemetery's 50 hectares. The area of the cemetery is defined by rank and social status of the dead with distinct areas: priests, soldiers, brotherhoods, the wealthy, the poor, infants, victims of epidemics, pagans and the condemned. The best preserved and grandest tombs stand on or near the central avenues and their axes.

With more than 800,000 graves and 1 million interments, space in the Colon Cemetery is currently at a premium and as such after three years remains are removed from their tombs, boxed and placed in a storage building.

Yet, for all its elegance and grandeur, the Colon Cemetery conceals as much as it displays. Empty tombs and desecrated family chapels disfigure the stately march of family memorials even in the most prominent of the avenues, and away from the central cross-streets are in ruin. Many of these are the tombs of exiled families, whose problems with caring for their dead have been complicated by residency outside of Cuba since the Revolution of 1959.

History
María Argelia Vizcaino writes: "The first stone was placed on October 30, 1871 and before its extension completed in 1934, it had a capacity of 504,458 square meters. Rectangular in shape as a Roman-Byzantine-style Roman camp, with sidewalks, streets and listed roads, facilitating access to the visitor, (which in republican times was provided with a free map). Enrique Martínez y Martínez tells us in «Cuba Arquitectura y Urbanismo»: “It was the most remarkable religious construction that was made in the city during the nineteenth century”.

The square located on the central street between the chapel and the huge doorway was called Christopher Columbus, because it was planned to erect a
monument to the Discoverer next to the remains, which ironically never happened of the Cathedral of Havana, being the first bust
erected throughout the continent (1828) and the only one that exists in the whole world with a beard. So the cemetery dedicated to the great
Admiral, full of famous sculptures lacks one by which he was given his name."

Design

The Cementerio Colón measures 620 by 800 meters (50 hectares, 122.5 acres). Designed by the Galician architect Calixto Arellano de Loira y Cardoso, a graduate of Madrid's Royal Academy of Arts of San Fernando, who became the Colón's first resident when he died and before his work was completed. It was built between 1871 and 1886, on former farmland. Laid out in a grid similar to El Vedado by numbered and lettered streets it becomes an urban microcosm of the city. The cemetery contains works by some of the most distinguished Cuban artists of the 19th and 20th centuries, such as Miguel Melero, José Vilalta de Saavedra, Rene Portocarrero, Rita longa, Eugenio Batista, Max Sorges Recio, Juan José Sicre, and others.

The design follows the custom of laying out the plan with five crosses formed by perpendicularly intersecting streets. The two main avenues give rise to the central cross, each of the four resulting spaces, called barracks, is subdivided in turn by two other streets that intersect at right angles. Five squares are formed at the intersections, the main one of which is the Central Chapel, with an octagonal floor plan and surrounded by portals, a Loire project completed with modifications by Francisco Marcotegui.

The cemetery is laid out roughly on a north–south axis, parallel to the last stretch of the Almendares River, and against the street grid of Vedado. It is on the north axis, thus its main streets are on the four cardinal points of the compass. Symbolized by a Greek cross, it represents the four directions of the earth and the spread of the gospel to all directions as well as the four platonic elements. We find Greek crosses against a yellow background along the perimeter fence enclosing the cemetery, as well as part of the design diagram of the cemetery, which employs several Greek crosses at different scales thus forming an architectural tapestry. The main avenues, Avenida Cristobal Colón, Obispo Espada, and Obispo Fray Jacinto, at six hundred by eight hundred meters, is the first cross at the scale of the city (red cross-areal photo).

Entrance

Calixto Arellano de Loira y Cardoso was also the designer of the main portal, of Romanesque inspiration. It is 21.66 meters high, 34.40 meters in length, and 2.50 meters in thickness, executed with variations by Eugenio Rayneri Sorrentino  for and eventually crowned, by José Vilalta Saavedra, by the sculptural group Fe. Esperanza y Caridad (Faith, Hope and Charity). The first stone for its construction was placed on October 30, 1871, since 1868 burials have been carried out.

Interments
The Colon Cemetery has a monument to the firefighters who lost their lives in the great fire of May 17, 1890.

As baseball is a leading sport in Cuba, the cemetery has two monuments to baseball players from the Cuban League. The first was erected in 1942 and the second in 1951 for members of the Cuban Baseball Hall of Fame.

In February 1898, the recovered bodies of sailors who died on the United States Navy battleship Maine were interred in the Colon Cemetery. In December 1899 the bodies were disinterred and brought back to the United States for burial at Arlington National Cemetery.

Also buried here are three British Commonwealth servicemen who are commemorated by the Commonwealth War Graves Commission; a Canadian Army officer of World War I, and a Royal Engineers officer and Royal Canadian Navy seaman of World War II. The remains of the casualties are located in the mausoleum of the Anglo-American Welfare Association, with the names inscribed on the central memorial which also forms the entrance to the underground ossuary.

Notable interments
 Alicia Alonso (1920–2019) prima ballerina assoluta.
 Beatriz Allende (1943–1977), Chilean socialist politician, revolutionary and surgeon
 Santiago Álvarez (1919–1998), filmmaker
 Manuel Arteaga y Betancourt (1879–1963), Roman Catholic Cardinal
 Alberto Azoy (?–1952), baseball manager
 Rosita Fornés (1923–2020) singer, actress, vedette.
 Beatriz Azurduy Palacios (1952–2003), filmmaker
 Hubert de Blanck (1856–1932), composer
 William Lee Brent (1931–2006), Black Panther Party member
 José Raúl Capablanca (1888–1942), world chess champion, nicknamed the "Mozart of Chess" and "The Human Chess Machine".
 Federico Capdevila (1845–1898), officer of the Spanish army who in 1871 defended Cuban students of medicine in court
 Alejo Carpentier (1904–1980), writer and musicologist
 Julián Castillo (1880–1948), baseball player
 Juan Chabás (1910–1954), author
 Eduardo Chibás (1907–1951), politician
 Ibrahim Ferrer (1927–2005), singer
 Candelaria Figueredo (1852–1914), patriot in the Cuban struggle for independence from Spain
 Carlos Finlay (1833–1915), physician and researcher
 María Teresa Freyre de Andrade (1896–1975), librarian
 José Miguel Gómez (1858–1921), president of Cuba
 Máximo Gómez (1836–1905), Dominican military hero
 Rubén González (1919–2003), pianist
 Nicolás Guillén (1902–1989), poet
 Nicolás Guillén Landrián (1938–2003), filmmaker and painter
 Tomás Gutiérrez Alea (1928–1996), filmmaker
 Harrison E. Havens (1837–1916), United States Congressman
 Alberto Korda (1928–2001), photographer
 Pío Leyva (1917–2006), singer
 José Lezama Lima (1910–1976), Cuban writer and poet
 Dulce María Loynaz (1902–1997), poet, novelist
 Dolf Luque (1890–1957), Major League Baseball starting pitcher
 Armando Marsans (1887–1960), Major League Baseball outfielder
 Rubén Martínez Villena (1899–1934), Cuban writer and revolutionary leader
 Mary McCarthy Gomez Cueto (1900–2009), Havana socialite, musician, impresario, and Roman Catholic philanthropist
 José de la Caridad Méndez (1887–1928), Negro leagues pitcher, nickname Black Diamond. Member Baseball Hall of Fame. Cooperstown.
 Laura Meneses (1894–1973), Cuban Revolution activist
 Angel D'Meza (1877–1954), Cuban League Baseball Player
  Rita Montaner (1900–1958), singer, actress, pianist, vedette
 William Alexander Morgan (1928–1961), American adventurer
 Pelayo Cuervo Navarro (1901–1957). Presidential Palace Attack, Havana
 Jaime Lucas Ortega y Alamino, (1936–2019), Roman Catholic Cardinal
 Fernando Ortiz (1881–1969), ethnomusicologist
  Agustin Parla Orduña (1877–1946), aviator, member of  Early Birds of Aviation
 German Pinelli (1907–1996), journalist, actor
 Chano Pozo (1915–1948), musician, pioneer of Afro-Cuban jazz
 Juan Ríus Rivera (1848–1924), Puerto Rican military hero
 Guillermo Rubalcaba (1927–2015), pianist and bandleader
 Eligio Sardiñas Montalvo (1910–1988), word boxing champion, nickname Kid Chocolate.
 Dr. Francisco Taquechel (1869–1955), notable doctor, founder (1898) and director of the Farmacia Taquechel, Old Havana
 Cristóbal Torriente  (1893–1938),  Negro leagues, nickname Babe Ruth of Cuba. Member Baseball Hall of Fame. Cooperstown.
 Lola Rodríguez de Tió (1848–1924), Puerto Rican poet
 Alberto Yarini (1882–1910), notable illegitimate businessman

Gallery

Notes

References

External links
 Panoramic photo of the Colon Cemetery
 Mapa del cementerio Colon
 Colón Cemetery
 Necropolis Cristobal Colon
 Why you should visit Colón Cemetery in Havana?
 The Secret Behind the Colón Cemetery in Havana
 

Religious buildings and structures in Havana
Cemeteries in Cuba
Museums in Havana
Buildings and structures in Havana
Tourist attractions in Havana
Architecture in Havana